Anjireh (also Romanized as Anjīreh) is a village in Sefidkuh Rural District, Samen District, Malayer County, Hamadan Province, Iran. At the 2006 census, its population was 190, in 41 families.

References 

Populated places in Malayer County